Franklyn Kilomé (born June 25, 1995) is a Dominican professional baseball pitcher in the Washington Nationals organization. He has played in Major League Baseball (MLB) for the New York Mets.

Professional career

Philadelphia Phillies
Kilomé signed with the Philadelphia Phillies as an international free agent in 2013. He made his professional debut in 2014 with the Gulf Coast Phillies where he posted a 3.12 ERA in 40 innings pitched. He pitched in 2015 for the Williamsport Crosscutters where he posted a 3–2 record with a 3.28 ERA in 11 starts. Kilomé spent 2016 with the Lakewood BlueClaws, pitching to a 5–8 record and 3.85 ERA. in 23 games started. Kilomé began 2017 with the Clearwater Threshers, and after posting a 6–4 record and a 2.59 ERA in 19 starts, was promoted to the Reading Fightin Phils where he finished the season, going 1–3 with a 3.64 ERA in five starts. The Phillies added Kilomé to their 40-man roster after the 2017 season. He began 2018 with Reading.

New York Mets
On July 27, 2018, Kilomé was traded to the New York Mets in exchange for Asdrúbal Cabrera. He was assigned to the Binghamton Rumble Ponies and finished the season there. In 26 combined starts between Reading and Binghamton, he was 4-9 with a 4.18 ERA. On October 25, 2018, it was announced that Kilomé would undergo Tommy John surgery and would miss the entire 2019 season.

He made his major league debut on August 1, 2020. In relief, he got through four innings while allowing two earned runs and striking out five.

On April 10, 2021, Kilomé was designated for assignment by the Mets after José Peraza was added to the roster. On April 16, Kilomé was outrighted to the alternate training site.

Washington Nationals
On April 25, 2022, Kilomé signed a minor league contract with the Washington Nationals organization and was assigned to the rookie-level Florida Complex League Nationals.

References

External links

1995 births
Living people
People from La Romana, Dominican Republic
Major League Baseball players from the Dominican Republic
Dominican Republic expatriate baseball players in the United States
Major League Baseball pitchers
New York Mets players
Florida Complex League Phillies players
Williamsport Crosscutters players
Lakewood BlueClaws players
Clearwater Threshers players
Leones del Escogido players
Reading Fightin Phils players
Binghamton Rumble Ponies players
Syracuse Mets players